Surgeon Rear-Admiral Walter John Elliot   QHS, MD, CM (12 January 1914 – 30 November 1979) was the 22nd Canadian Surgeon General.

Born in Harrison Hot Springs, British Columbia, Elliot was educated at Queen's University where he graduated with a medical degree in 1937. He completed post-graduate training at The Hospital for Sick Children in Toronto, from 1943 to 1944.

Elliot joined the Royal Navy Volunteer Reserve in 1940 as a medical officer, where he served on escort ships in the North Atlantic.

He was promoted to Commodore in 1961 and appointed Deputy Surgeon General (Professional), and Surgeon General in 1964.

Elliot died 30 November 1979 at the age of 65.

Awards and decorations 
Allan's personal awards and decorations include the following:

Allan was given the title of Queen's Honorary Surgeon by the Medical Household.

References 

1914 births
1979 deaths
Surgeons General of Canada
People from the Fraser Valley Regional District
Queen's University at Kingston alumni
Royal Canadian Navy officers
Naval surgeons
Royal Navy Medical Service officers
Royal Naval Volunteer Reserve personnel of World War II
Royal Canadian Navy personnel of World War II
Canadian admirals
Canadian military personnel from British Columbia